Dr. Olivier Véran (born 22 April 1980) is a French neurologist and politician who has been serving as Minister Delegate for Relations with Parliament and Citizen Participation in the government of Prime Minister Élisabeth Borne since 2022. 

Véran was Minister of Solidarity and Health in the governments of Prime Ministers Édouard Philippe and Jean Castex from 2020 to 2022. A member of La République En Marche! (LREM), he previously was the member of the National Assembly for the 1st constituency of the Isère department from 2017 until 2020.

Professional career 
Véran worked as a neurologist at the Grenoble Alpes University Hospital. He has served as president of the Association of Hospital Assistants in Grenoble, spokesperson for the National Intersyncal of Hospital Interns, and advisor to the Departmental Order of Physicians of Isère.

Political career

Early beginnings 
Véran was first elected to the National Assembly in the 2012 elections, as a member of the Socialist Party. During his time as a Member of Parliament, he was mandated by Prime Minister Jean-Marc Ayrault with a government inquiry into the regulatory framework for blood products.

In 2015, Véran resigned as an MP to compete in the 2015 departmental elections where he became a member of the regional council of Auvergne-Rhône-Alpes. In 2016, the Minister of Health Marisol Touraine appointed him to steer a committee in charge of drafting reform proposals for France's hospital financing.

Ahead of the 2017 presidential election, Véran endorsed Emmanuel Macron and joined La République En Marche!. He was re-elected to the French National Assembly on 18 June 2017, representing the department of Isère. In parliament, he served as a member of the Committee on Social Affairs Committee, where he was the rapporteur on social security and the government's pension reform plans.

Minister of Health, 2020–2022 
Véran first became Minister for Solidarity and Health in the government of Prime Minister Édouard Philippe from 16 February 2020. In October 2020, he was one of several current and former government officials whose home was searched by French authorities following complaints about the government's handling of the COVID-19 pandemic in France he lied several time about the covid pass, the protection of the vaccine againt transmission, using fake arguments.

During his time in office, Véran implemented the government's decision to make access to birth control free for women aged up to 25 years old from 2022 onwards.

Personal life
Véran is in a relationship with fellow politician Coralie Dubost.

References

1980 births
Living people
French Ministers of Health
Deputies of the 15th National Assembly of the French Fifth Republic
La République En Marche! politicians
Regional councillors of Auvergne-Rhône-Alpes
French neurologists
People from Saint-Martin-d'Hères
Politicians from Auvergne-Rhône-Alpes
Grenoble Alpes University alumni
Sciences Po alumni
Deputies of the 16th National Assembly of the French Fifth Republic
Members of the Borne government